Herbert Gauls (13 August 1930 in Koblenz – 17 January 2017) was a German photographer.

Biography 
Herbert Gauls visited the Kaiser Wilhelm Real Gymnasium in Koblenz and in 1946 he spent a year at a private trade school. At the age of twenty, Gauls started the small photo shop "Herbert Gauls Photo retailers, specialist laboratory and Ansichtskartenverlag" at the Münzplatz in Koblenz. For decades he worked as an architectural and documentary photographer and also as a photojournalist for News media and Television.

In 1966 he joined the Photographer master's certificate in Hamburg with the best rating and erected immediately afterwards a building with a photo studio and specialized laboratories in the Carl Mand Road in Koblenz industrial area. In 1971 the studio enlarged into a 5-storey office building. Seven years later he built the new and current headquarters, a 1,000 m² photography studio in the August Horch Strasse in Koblenz. In the same year he received his first award the Wappenteller of Koblenz.

As a photographer Gauls documented the Handwerkskammer Koblenz in the late 1960s and early 1970s with numerous exhibitions, including the art of the Neuwied blacksmith and metal sculptor Klaus Rudolf Werhand.

According to his 80th birthday Herbert Gauls bequeathed in the year 2010 his extensive photographic archive on the recent history of the city with around two million negatives to the city of Koblenz. In 2012 Herbert Gauls was given the Verdienstmedaille des Landes Rheinland-Pfalz by the Minister-President of Rhineland-Palatinate Kurt Beck for his volunteer work for the common good.

Herbert Gauls lived in Weitersburg.

Awards 
 1978: Verleihung des Wappentellers of the city of Koblenz
 1989–2002: Master of the Upper Middle Rhine Photographers Guild
 1997: Awarded the Golden Badge of Honour of the German Central Association of Professional Photographers
 2000: Ehrennadel of Rhineland-Palatinate
 2002: Honorary Master of the Upper Middle Rhine Photographers Guild
 2012: Awarded the Verdienstmedaille des Landes Rheinland-Pfalz by the Minister-President of Rhineland-Palatinate Kurt Beck

Exhibitions (selection) 
 1969: "Photo Exhibition Herbert Gauls" Handwerkskammer Koblenz Galerie Handwerk Koblenz
 1992: "A photographer sees his city" in Löhr-Center on the occasion of the 2,000th anniversary of Koblenz
 2005: 24 March – 16 May: Special Exhibition: "Herbert Gaul – on the road to taking pictures" in the Mittelrhein-Museum

Books 
 Paul Theodor Schmitz: Koblenzer Skizzen – Photography by Herbert Gauls, Görres-Druckerei, Koblenz, 1964
 Januarius Zick: Gemälde und Zeichnungen – Photography by Herbert Gauls, Koblenz : Mittelrhein-Museum, 1972  
 Fotoband "Koblenz. Bewegte Zeiten – Die 50er Jahre" with texts by Gudrun Tribukait, Wartberg-Verlag, Gudensberg-Gleichen, 1995, 
 Fotoband "Koblenz. Bewegte Zeiten – Die 60er Jahre" with texts by Christine Vary, Wartberg-Verlag, Gudensberg-Gleichen, 1999, 
 Das Jubiläum 50 Jahre with texts by Reinhard Kallenbach, 2000

References

External links 
 
 Herbert Gauls at WorldCat

1930 births
2017 deaths
German photojournalists
Conceptual photographers
Architectural photographers
Portrait photographers
Street photographers
German contemporary artists
Commercial photographers
Travel photographers
Interior photographers
Nature photographers
People from the Rhine Province
Photographers from Rhineland-Palatinate
Artists from Koblenz
20th-century German photographers
21st-century German photographers